is a rechargeable contactless smart card ticketing system for public transport in Fukuoka, Fukuoka Prefecture, Japan. Fukuoka City Transportation Bureau introduced the system on March 7, 2009. 

On March 13, 2010, Hayakaken has been interoperated with two similar cards in Fukuoka—namely nimoca by Nishi-Nippon Railroad (Nishitetsu) and SUGOCA from Kyūshū Railway Company (JR Kyūshū)—plus Suica, a card used in Greater Tokyo Area by East Japan Railway Company (JR East). Like other electronic fare collection systems in Japan, the card uses RFID technology developed by Sony corporation known as FeliCa.

On March 23, 2013, Hayakaken has also been made interoperable with six other similar cards using the same FeliCa technology, including PASMO, PiTaPa, Manaca, ICOCA, TOICA, and Kitaca.

Usable area
All lines of Fukuoka City Subway, namely Hakozaki Line, Kūkō Line, and Nanakuma Line accept the card.

Types of cards
Unregistered card
Registered card: The card can be reissued if a user lost it.
Commuter's pass: Needs a registration. The card can be reissued.

References

Fare collection systems in Japan
Contactless smart cards
Smart cards introduced in 2009